Cruicetown Church is a medieval church and National Monument in County Meath, Ireland.

Location

History

Cruicetown is named after the Cruise family, ancestors of actor Tom Cruise. The church was built c. 1200, as evidenced by the round-headed windows with external rabbets for shutters. A church of the "vill de Cruicetoun" is listed in the ecclesiastical taxation (1302–06) of Pope Nicholas IV. It was described as ruined by 1641.

Church

Cruicetown Church is a nave and chancel. Within the nave is a red sandstone baptismal font and several carved fragments.

In the chancel is the double effigy tomb of Walter Cruice of Naul (d. 1663) and Elizabeth Cruice of Brittas which was erected in 1688 by their son Patrick Cruise. The grave is decorated with trumpet-blowing putti. A carved cross also stands in the graveyard.

References

Churches in County Meath
Archaeological sites in County Meath
National Monuments in County Meath
Former churches in the Republic of Ireland